Euro War, also known as Macaroni Combat, Macaroni War, Spaghetti Combat, or Spaghetti War, is a broad subgenre of war film that emerged in the mid-1960s. The films were named Euro War because most were produced and directed by European co-productions, most notably and commonly by Italians, as indicated by the subgenre's other nicknames that draw parallels to those films within the mostly Italian Spaghetti Western genre.

The typical team was made up of an Italian director, Italo-Spanish technical staff, and a cast of Italian and Spanish actors and sometimes German and French, sometimes a minor or fading Hollywood star. The films were primarily shot in Europe and later, the Philippines.

History
From the mid-1960s, much like in the case of the Italian spaghetti western in relation to American Hollywood Westerns, the Macaroni Combat film mimicked the success of American films such as The Guns Of Navarone,The Dirty Dozen and Where Eagles Dare. Like spaghetti westerns, Euro War films were characterized by their production in the Italian language, low budgets, added violence, and a recognizable highly fluid and minimalist cinematography. This was partly intentional and partly the context and cultural background of the filmmakers.  Throughout the 1960s and 1970s the films were almost all set during World War II with a few about mercenaries in Africa following the success of Dark of the Sun and later, The Wild Geese. In the 1980s most entries in the genre were set during the Vietnam War following the success of The Deer Hunter and Apocalypse Now.

Some were also made to capitalize the success of Vietnam  War rescue  mission movies like Missing In Action, Uncommon Valor and Rambo First Blood Part 2. Some were also made to capitalize on the success of movies having American involvement in Middle East missions against  terrorist activities likeThe Delta Force and Death Before Dishonor, Delta Force Commando part 1. Some were also made to capitalize on the success of Soviet Afghan war movies like Rambo 3 and Delta Force Commando part 2.
Two popular examples of the Italian-made World War II films were Anzio (1968) and Hornets' Nest(1970) with their A-list cast members. Today, one of the better-known films to fit the Macaroni Combat archetype is the 1978 film The Inglorious Bastards directed by Enzo G. Castellari. Influenced heavily by the aforementioned 1967 American film, The Dirty Dozen, it would later inspire Quentin Tarantino's 2009 film Inglourious Basterds, an American-produced film influenced by the genre as a whole.

Films

 Some Like It Cold (1960)
 Under Ten Flags (1960)
 Then There Were Three (1961)
 The Best of Enemies (1961)
 La guerra continua  (Warriors Five) (1962)
 Torpedo Bay  (1962)
 Marcia o Crepa (The Legion's Last Patrol / Commando) (1962)
 The Shortest Day (1962)
 I due colonnelli (Two Colonels) (1962)
 The Changing of the Guard (1962)
 Attack and Retreat (Italiani brava gente) (1964)
 War Italian Style (1966) 
 Dirty Heroes (1967)
 Desert Commandos (1967)
 Hell in Normandy (1967)
 Commandos (1968)
 Suicide Commandos (1968)
 Quella dannata pattuglia (The Battle of the Damned) (1968)
 Anzio (1968)
 Battle of the Last Panzer (1969)
 The Red Berets (1969)
 Eagles Over London (1969)
 Salt in the Wound (1969)
 Bridge over the Elbe (1969)
 The Battle of El Alamein (1969)
 36 Hours to Hell (1969)
 Desert Assault (1969)
 Hora cero: Operación Rommel ( A Bullet For Rommel  / The Battle Giants ) (1969)
 La legione dei dannati (Battle of the Commandos / Legion of the Damned) (1969) 
 Five for Hell (1969)
 War Devils (1969)
 Churchill's Leopards (1970)
 Hornets' Nest (1970)
 Heroes in Hell (1973)
 The Heroes (1973)
 Hell River (1974)
 The Inglorious Bastards (1978)
 Battle Force (1978)
 The Wild Geese Attack Again (1978)
 Tough to Kill 1978
 From Hell to Victory (1979)
 The Last Hunter (1980)
 Odd Squad 1981
 Tiger Joe 1982
 Last Blood (1983)
 Code Name: Wild Geese (1984)
 Kommando Leopard (1985)
 Operation Nam (1986)
 Strike Commando (1987)
 Delta Force Commando (1988)
 Last Platoon 1988
 Strike Commando 2 (1988)
 Striker 1988
 Born to Fight (1989)
 Casablanca Express (1989)
 Leathernecks (1989)

Personalities

Actors

 Lewis Collins
 Richard Harrison
 George Hilton
 Klaus Kinski
 Guy Madison
 Frederick Stafford
 Bo Svenson
 Lee Van Cleef
 David Warbeck
 Fred Williamson
 Jack Palance

Directors
 Enzo G. Castellari
 Umberto Lenzi
 Antonio Margheriti
 Roberto Bianchi Montero

See also 
 Spaghetti Western
 War film
 Partisan film

References

Further reading

Italian films by genre
Film genres